There are hundreds of US Navy aircraft squadrons which are not currently active dating back to before World War II (the U.S. Navy operated aircraft prior to World War I, but it did not organize them in squadrons until after that war). To be more accurate: there are hundreds of former U.S. Navy aircraft squadrons which have been disestablished and no longer exist and there are approximately 40 or so U.S. Navy aircraft squadrons which have been deactivated and which currently exist only "on paper" in an inactive status. These disestablished and/or deactivated squadrons are sometimes incorrectly referred to as "decommissioned" squadrons, but proper usage prior to 1998, was that squadrons were "established" and "disestablished" and after 1998, squadrons are "established", "deactivated" and sometimes "reactivated". It has never been correct to refer to U.S. Navy aircraft squadrons as being "commissioned" and "decommissioned", ships are commissioned and decommissioned, U.S. Navy aircraft squadrons are not.

Disestablished or deactivated helicopter squadrons

Disestablished and Deactivated Utility (HU) squadrons and Combat Support (HC) squadrons and HC designations no longer in use
The HU designation was the first designation created for Navy helicopter squadrons. It was created in 1948 with the establishment of the Navy's first two operational helicopter squadrons: "Utility" squadrons One and Two (HU-1 and HU-2). In July 1965 the "Combat Support" designation (HC) was created when the three existing "Utility" squadrons (HU-1, HU-2 and HU-4) were redesignated "Combat Support" squadrons. The HC designation was used to designate squadrons whose primary function was either logistics or the provision of utility services with two notable exceptions; HC-7 and HC-9 were Combat Search and Rescue squadrons. In April 2005 all existing HC squadrons but one were redesignated Helicopter Sea Combat (HSC) squadrons and the single remaining HC squadron (the second squadron to be designated HC-4) was deactivated on 28 September 2007. Since 28 September 2007 the HC designation exists only as the designation for that single inactive squadron.

HU/HC squadrons were numbered sequentially beginning with HU-1/HC-1 with odd numbers given to Pacific Fleet squadrons and even numbers to Atlantic Fleet squadrons. The jump from HC-11 to HC-16 occurred because HC-16 was originally established by the Naval Air Training Command as HCT-16 to provide Plane Guard services aboard the Naval Air Training Command's training Aircraft Carrier USS Lexington (AVT-16). It was redesignated HC-16 when it was administratively transferred from the Naval Air Training Command to Commander, Naval Air Forces Atlantic Fleet in 1977. HC-85 was a redesignation of the Navy Reserve's HS-85 and it kept its designation number through the redesignation.

The table below does not list disestablished squadrons; it is a list of squadron designations which are no longer in use. Some of the squadron designations in the table belonged to squadrons which have been disestablished, some are former designations of HSC squadrons which are still active, and one is a designation of a currently inactive squadron.

Note: The parenthetical (1st), (2nd), (3rd) etc... appended to some designations in the table below are not a part of the squadron designation system. They are added to indicate that the designation was used more than once during the history of U.S. Naval Aviation and which use of the designation is indicated. Absence indicates that the designation was used only once.

Disestablished and Deactivated Anti-submarine (HS) squadrons and HS designations no longer in use
The HS designation was created in 1951 to designate Anti-Submarine squadrons and was in use until the last active HS squadron was redesignated to Helicopter Sea Combat (HSC) squadron on 1 June 2016. The designation has not been in active use since.

HS designations were numbered sequentially beginning with HS-1 without regard to carrier air group (later carrier air wing) assignment, though; odd numbered designations were given to Atlantic Fleet squadrons and even numbered designations to Pacific Fleet squadrons (the opposite of the HC designation scheme). USNR HS designations were numbered in accordance with the Reserve Carrier Air Antisubmarine Groups (CVSGR) for which they were established for assignment: HS-74 and HS-75 to CVSGR-70, and HS-84 and HS-85 to CVSGR-80.

The table below does not list disestablished squadrons; it is a list of squadron designations which are no longer in use. Some of the squadron designations in the table belonged to squadrons which have been disestablished but some are former designations of HSC squadrons which are still active. There are currently two inactive HS squadrons, HS-75 which was deactivated in 2007 and HS-10 which was deactivated in 2012.

Note: The parenthetical (1st), (2nd), (3rd) etc... appended to some designations in the table below are not a part of the squadron designation system. They are added to indicate that the designation was used more than once during the history of U.S. Naval Aviation and which use of the designation is indicated. Absence indicates that the designation was used only once.

Deactivated Sea Combat (HSC) squadrons
The "Sea Combat" (HSC) designation was instituted April 2005 when the "Combat Support" (HC) squadrons conducting at sea logistics had completed their transitions from the H-46 to the multi-mission MH-60S. Beginning in 2007 the "Helicopter Anti-submarine" (HS) squadrons began transitioning to the MH-60S as well relinquishing the anti-submarine role aboard the aircraft carrier to the new "Maritime Strike" (HSM) squadrons. The HSC designation identifies squadrons with the primary functions of Naval Special Warfare support, Anti-surface Warfare, Combat Search and Rescue, and Vertical Replenishment.

Disestablished and deactivated Anti-submarine (Light) (HSL) squadrons and HSL designations no longer in use
The "Anti-submarine Squadron (Light)" (HSL) designation was established in 1972 to designate anti-submarine squadrons which operated the "light" SH-2 helicopter (as compared to the HS squadrons' much larger SH-3 helicopters) in detachments aboard surface force ships as a part of the "Light Airborne Multipurpose System" (LAMPS Mk I) program to provide surface ships with a helicopter to extend the ship's sensor and weapons ranges. The designation was discontinued in active use in July 2015 when the last HSL squadron was redesignated a Helicopter Maritime Strike (HSM) squadron. The designation currently exists only attached to two inactive HSL squadrons which were deactivated in 2001.

HSL designations began with HSL-30 and squadrons were numbered sequentially with even numbers assigned to Atlantic Fleet squadrons and odd numbers to Pacific Fleet squadrons (in line with the HC designation scheme but opposite of the HS numbering system). When new HSL squadrons were established to operate the new LAMPS Mk III system they were designated beginning with HSL-40 and continued the even Atlantic and odd Pacific scheme. HSL-74 and HSL-84 were redesignations of the Navy Reserve's HS-74 and HS-84 and they kept their designation numbers through the redesignation. When HSL-94 was established it was designated to fit the pattern HSL-74, 84, 94.

Disestablished and Deactivated Light Attack (HAL) and Combat Support (Special) (HCS) squadrons
The "Light Attack" (HAL) designation was created in 1967 when HC-1's attack helicopter detachment was established as a separate squadron. In 1988 the functions of the two Navy Reserve Light Attack squadrons were merged with the function of the single Navy Reserve Combat Search and Rescue Squadron (HC-9) the two light attack squadrons were redesignated to "Combat Support (Special)" (HCS). The HCS designation remained in active use until 2006 when one of the squadrons was redesignated to Helicopter Sea Combat (HSC) squadron and the other was deactivated.

Disestablished Mine Countermeasure (HM) squadrons 
The HM designation was established in 1971 to designate "Mine Countermeasures" squadrons. It remains in use to the present day.

Disestablished other helicopter squadrons

See also
 List of United States Navy aircraft squadrons
 List of United States Navy aircraft wings
 Naval aviation
 Modern US Navy carrier air operations
 List of United States Navy aircraft designations (pre-1962) / List of US Naval aircraft
 United States Naval Aviator
 Naval Flight Officer
 United States Marine Corps Aviation
 Military aviation

References and notes
Notes

References

Bibliography
Dictionary of American Naval Aviation Squadrons:

External links
 DANAS Volume 1 - The History of VA, VAH, VAK, VAL, VAP and VFA Squadrons (1995)
 Chapter 1 – The Evolution of Aircraft Class and Squadron Designation Systems
 Appendix 4 – U.S. Navy Squadron Designations and Abbreviations
 Appendix 6 – Lineage Listing for VA, VA(AW), VAH, VA(HM), VAK, VAL, VAP, and VFA Squadrons (2000)
 DANAS Volume 2 - The History of VP, VPB, VP(H) and VP(AM) Squadrons
 Chapter 2 – Guidelines for Navy Aviation Squadron Lineage and Insignia
 Appendix 4 – Lineage Listing for VP, VB, VPB, VP(HL), VP(ML), VP(MS) and VP(AM) Squadrons
 OPNAVINST 5030.4G – Navy Aviation Squadron Lineage and Naval Aviation Command Insignia (2012)

Aircraft squadrons
Aircraft squadrons list, Inactive
Squadrons